The 1931–32 FAW Welsh Cup is the 51st season of the annual knockout tournament for competitive football teams in Wales.

Key
League name pointed after clubs name.
CCL - Cheshire County League
FL D2 - Football League Second Division
FL D3N - Football League Third Division North
FL D3S - Football League Third Division South
MWL - Mid-Wales Football League
SFL - Southern Football League
WLN - Welsh League North
WLS D1 - Welsh League South Division One
WLS D2 - Welsh League South Division Two
W&DL - Wrexham & District Amateur League

First round

Second round
15 winners from the First round and one new club - Llanerch Celts. Bettisfield get a bye to the Third round.

Third round
7 winners from the Second round plus Bettisfield. Llanidloes Town get a bye to the Fourth round.

Fourth round
Four winners from the Third round, Llanidloes Town plus 11 new clubs.

Fifth round
Eight winners from the Fourth round plus eight new teams.

Sixth round

Semifinal
All semifinals were held at Chester.

Final

External links
The FAW Welsh Cup

1931-32
Wales
Cup